Urban shamanism distinguishes traditional shamanism found in indigenous societies from Western adaptations that draw on contemporary and modern roots. Urban shamanism is practiced primarily by people who do not originate in a traditional indigenous society and who create unique methods that do not follow or claim authenticity in any prior tradition. Urban shamanism traces its beginnings to efforts by Westerners to come to terms with psychoactive plant experiences using their own modern frames of cultural reference influenced by, but outside of, the indigenous rites in which plant medicine is traditionally based. The related terms digital shamanism and digital psychedelia are schools of thought born out of the convergence of technological changes, art movements, and Eastern philosophies during the late 20th century. They parallel and are often associated with technopaganism. In practice, the digital psychedelic process is the fusion of the biological and technological to seek self-knowledge.

See also
Cyberdelic

References 
"Religion in Japan: Arrows to Heaven and Earth" by Janet Goff. Japan Quarterly. Tokyo: Jul-Sep 1997.Vol.44, Iss. 3;  pg. 105.  (Reviewing Religion in Japan, Cambridge University Press, 1996.)
Roberts, T. B. (editor) (2001). Psychoactive Sacramentals: Essays on Entheogens and Religion. San Francosco: Council on Spiritual Practices. 
Roberts, T. B., and Hruby, P. J. (1995–2002). Religion and Psychoactive Sacraments An Entheogen Chrestomathy. Online archive.  
Roberts, T. B. "Chemical Input—Religious Output: Entheogens." Chapter 10 in Where God and Science Meet: Vol. 3: The Psychology of Religious Experience Robert McNamara (editor) (2006). Westport, CT: Praeger/Greenwood.
Hall, W (2005). "Crash Course in Urban Shamanism"
King, Serge Kahili (1990). Urban Shaman. Simon & Schuster. 

Psychedelia
Neoshamanism
Modern primitive